Dóra Hornyák (born 24 January 1992) is a Hungarian handballer for Debreceni VSC and the Hungarian national team.

Achievements
Nemzeti Bajnokság I:
Gold Medallist: 2013, 2014
Silver Medallist: 2010, 2011, 2016, 2017, 2018
Bronze Medallist: 2009
Magyar Kupa:
Gold Medallist: 2013, 2014, 2017
Silver Medallist: 2009, 2011
EHF Champions League
Winner: 2013, 2014
Junior European Championship:
Silver Medallist: 2009

Individual awards
Hungarian Youth Handballer of the Year: 2009, 2010

Personal life
She is in a relationship with former handball player, Gergely Pál. She gave birth to their son, Bendegúz on 26 May 2019.

References

External links
Dóra Hornyák career statistics at Worldhandball

1992 births
Living people
Hungarian female handball players
Sportspeople from Debrecen
Győri Audi ETO KC players
Ferencvárosi TC players (women's handball)